The Blue Ribbon College Basketball Yearbook is an annual publication which includes preseason previews of every NCAA Division I men's college basketball team in the United States.  Created in 1981 by future Boston Celtics general manager Chris Wallace, it is currently compiled by a team of college basketball writers led by Chris Dortch.  The 384-page publication has been described as the "Bible" of college basketball, and its preseason rankings and awards predictions are widely reported in the press. 

Since 2000, Blue Ribbon Publications has also produced an annual college football yearbook.

Notes

External links
Blue Ribbon Sports Media Group, LLC
Blue Ribbon on Facebook

College men's basketball in the United States
College basketball mass media in the United States
Publications established in 1981